Rheide and similar can refer to:-

Two villages in Schleswig-Holstein (see List of places in Schleswig-Flensburg):
Groß Rheide
Klein Rheide

A small river:
Rheider Au 

Others:
 Rheid, a solid material that deforms by viscous flow